Cherokee County (county code CK) is a U.S. county located in Southeast Kansas. As of the 2020 census, the county population was 19,362. Its county seat is Columbus, and its most populous city is Baxter Springs. The latter became the first "cow town" in Kansas during the 1870s and the period of cattle drives.

History

19th century
In 1803, United States acquired from France the 828,000-square mile Louisiana Purchase, the former French lands west of the Mississippi River, for 2.83 cents per acre. This territory included most of the land for modern-day Kansas.

In the 1830s, the United States conducted Indian Removal of the Five Civilized Tribes from the Southeast region, to extinguish their land claims and allow European-American settlement in the area. They were given lands in what was called Indian Territory west of the Mississippi River, mostly in present-day Oklahoma. This part of Kansas was included at the time in the Cherokee Neutral Lands, and the county was named after this tribe.

In 1854, the U.S. organized the Kansas Territory. Settlers began to move into the territory, with violence breaking out between supporters of slavery and those who wanted to abolish it. In 1861, Kansas was admitted as the 34th U.S. state; its constitution prohibited slavery. In 1860, Cherokee County was established.

Geography

Adjacent counties
 Crawford County (north)
 Jasper County, Missouri (east)
 Newton County, Missouri (southeast)
 Ottawa County, Oklahoma (south)
 Craig County, Oklahoma (southwest)
 Labette County (west)

Major highways
Sources:  National Atlas, U.S. Census Bureau

 U.S. Route 66 (decommissioned)
 U.S. Route 69
 U.S. Route 160
 U.S. Route 166
 Kansas Highway 7
 Kansas Highway 26
 Kansas Highway 57
 Kansas Highway 66 (successor to the decommissioned U.S. 66)
 Kansas Highway 96
 Kansas Highway 102

Demographics

As of the 2000 census, there were 22,605 people, 8,875 households, and 6,239 families residing in the county.  The population density was 38 people per square mile (15/km2).  There were 10,031 housing units at an average density of 17 per square mile (7/km2).  The racial makeup of the county was 92.27% White, 0.61% Black or African American, 3.45% Native American, 0.23% Asian, 0.04% Pacific Islander, 0.50% from other races, and 2.90% from two or more races. Hispanic or Latino of any race were 1.29% of the population.

There were 8,875 households, out of which 32.40% had children under the age of 18 living with them, 56.60% were married couples living together, 9.70% had a female householder with no husband present, and 29.70% were non-families. 26.30% of all households were made up of individuals, and 13.00% had someone living alone who was 65 years of age or older.  The average household size was 2.51 and the average family size was 3.02.

In the county, the population was spread out, with 26.50% under the age of 18, 8.40% from 18 to 24, 26.90% from 25 to 44, 23.10% from 45 to 64, and 15.20% who were 65 years of age or older.  The median age was 37 years. For every 100 females there were 94.20 males.  For every 100 females age 18 and over, there were 90.70 males.

The median income for a household in the county was $30,505, and the median income for a family was $37,284. Males had a median income of $29,045 versus $19,675 for females. The per capita income for the county was $14,710.  About 11.40% of families and 14.30% of the population were below the poverty line, including 19.40% of those under age 18 and 10.60% of those age 65 or over.

Government

Presidential elections
For most of its history, Cherokee County had more of a Democratic lean in presidential elections than the rest of the state, particularly before 1968. Since then, it has only voted for Democratic candidates twice. In 1976 & 1992, it was their second and fourth best county in the state, respectively. From 1996 on, the county has swung powerfully Republican similar to the rest of Southeast Kansas, with Hillary Clinton posting the worst percentage for a Democratic candidate ever at only 23.3%.

Laws
Although the Kansas Constitution was amended in 1986 to allow the sale of alcoholic liquor by the individual drink with the approval of voters, Cherokee County voters chose to remain a prohibition, or "dry", county on Sunday until 2012.

Education

Unified school districts
 Southeast USD 247 is a  school district primarily covering portions of Crawford and Cherokee counties, but also includes small portions of Labette and Neosho counties.  It serves over 800 students in grades Pre-K through 12.  Southeast High School (the "Lancers") is located just west of the city of Cherokee (where the district office is located).  In Cherokee County the district serves the cities of Weir and West Mineral.
 Riverton USD 404
 Columbus USD 493
 Galena USD 499
 Baxter Springs USD 508

Communities

Cities
Baxter Springs
Columbus
Galena
Roseland
Scammon
Weir
West Mineral

Unincorporated communities
† means a Census-Designated Place (CDP) by the United States Census Bureau.‡This community also has portions in an adjacent county or counties.

 Carona
 Cokedale
 Crestline†
 Empire City
 Faulkner
 Hallowell†
 Keelville
 Kniveton‡
 Lawton
 Lowell†
 Melrose
 Neutral
 Riverton†
 Sherman
 Sherwin
 Skidmore
 Stippville
 Turck

Ghost towns
 Treece, officially disincorporated in 2012 by the state of Kansas

Townships
Cherokee County is divided into fourteen townships.  The cities of Baxter Springs, Columbus, Galena, Scammon, and Weir are considered governmentally independent and are excluded from the census figures for the townships.  In the following table, the population center is the largest city (or cities) included in that township's population total, if it is of a significant size.

See also
National Register of Historic Places listings in Cherokee County, Kansas

References

Notes

Further reading

 History of Cherokee County, Kansas; Biographical Publishing Co; 646 pages; 1904.
 Plat Book of Cherokee County, Kansas; Missouri Publishing Co; 35 pages; 1902.

External links

County
 
 Cherokee County - Directory of Public Officials
Historical
 "Mined Lands" video
Maps
 Cherokee County Maps: Current, Historic, KDOT
 Kansas Highway Maps: Current, Historic, KDOT
 Kansas Railroad Maps: Current, 1996, 1915, KDOT and Kansas Historical Society

 
1860 establishments in Kansas Territory
Kansas placenames of Native American origin
Kansas counties
Ozarks
Populated places established in 1860